Fool Creek Peak (also known as Fool Peak and Scipio Peak) is a mountain peak in Fishlake National Forest in the state of Utah in the United States. At 9,712 feet high, it's the highest peak in the Canyon Mountains. A tower is on the top of the peak.

References

North American 3000 m summits
Fishlake National Forest
Mountains of Utah